Harkaleh-ye Mohammadabad (also Romanized as Hārkaleh-ye Moḩammadābād; also known as Maḩmūdābād and Shahrak-e Hārkaleh) is a village in Sadat Rural District, in the Central District of Lali County, Khuzestan Province, Iran. At the 2006 census, its population was 113, in 17 families.

References 

Populated places in Lali County